A list of crime films released in the 2010s.

Notes

Crime films
2010s